German submarine U-261 was a Type VIIC U-boat of Nazi Germany's Kriegsmarine during World War II. The submarine was laid down on 17 May 1941 at the Bremer Vulkan yard at Bremen-Vegesack as yard number 26, launched on 16 February 1942 and commissioned on 28 March under the command of Kapitänleutnant Hans Lange. After training with the 8th U-boat Flotilla, U-261 was transferred to the 6th U-boat Flotilla, for front-line service from 1 September 1942.

U-261 sank no ships in her short career. Her only patrol began when she departed Kiel on 8 September 1942. Her route took her through the gap between the Faroe and Shetland Islands toward the Atlantic Ocean. She never got that far. On 15 September 1942, she was sunk by an Armstrong Whitworth Whitley of No. 58 Squadron RAF west of the Scottish island group.

Design
German Type VIIC submarines were preceded by the shorter Type VIIB submarines. U-261 had a displacement of  when at the surface and  while submerged. She had two shafts and two  propellers.

U-261 was fitted with five  torpedo tubes (four fitted at the bow and one at the stern), fourteen torpedoes, one  SK C/35 naval gun, 220 rounds, and two twin  C/30 anti-aircraft guns. The boat had a complement of between forty-four and sixty.

References

Bibliography

External links

German Type VIIC submarines
U-boats commissioned in 1942
U-boats sunk in 1942
World War II submarines of Germany
World War II shipwrecks in the Atlantic Ocean
1941 ships
Ships built in Bremen (state)
U-boats sunk by British aircraft
U-boats sunk by depth charges
Ships lost with all hands
Maritime incidents in September 1942